Einstein synchronisation (or Poincaré–Einstein synchronisation) is a convention  for synchronising clocks at different places by means of signal exchanges. This synchronisation method was used by telegraphers in the middle 19th century, but was popularized by Henri Poincaré and Albert Einstein, who applied it to light signals and recognized its fundamental role in relativity theory. Its principal value is for clocks within a single inertial frame.

Einstein
According to Albert Einstein's prescription from 1905, a light signal is sent at time  from clock 1 to clock 2 and immediately back, e.g. by means of a mirror. This synchronisation convention sets clock 2 so that the time  of signal reflection is defined to be

The same synchronisation is achieved by "slowly" transporting a third clock from clock 1 to clock 2, in the limit of vanishing transport velocity. The literature discusses many other thought experiments for clock synchronisation giving the same result.

The problem is whether this synchronisation does really succeed in assigning a time label to any event in a consistent way. To that end one should find conditions under which:

If point (a) holds then it makes sense to say that clocks are synchronised. Given (a), if (b1)–(b3) hold then the synchronisation allows us to build a global time function . The slices . are called "simultaneity slices".

Einstein (1905) did not recognize the possibility of reducing (a) and (b1)–(b3) to easily verifiable physical properties of light propagation (see below). Instead he just wrote "We assume that this definition of synchronism is free from contradictions, and possible for any number of points; and that the following (that is b2–b3) relations are universally valid."

Max von Laue was the first to study the problem of the consistency of Einstein's synchronisation. Ludwik Silberstein presented a similar study although he left most of his claims as an exercise for the readers of his textbook on relativity. Max von Laue's arguments were taken up again by Hans Reichenbach, and found a final shape in a work by Alan Macdonald. The solution is that the Einstein synchronisation satisfies the previous requirements if and only if the following two conditions hold:

 No redshift: If from point A two flashes are emitted separated by a time interval  as recorded by a clock at A, then they reach B separated by the same time interval  as recorded by a clock at B.
 Reichenbach's round-trip condition: If a light beam is sent over the triangle ABC, starting from A and reflected by mirrors at B and C, then its arrival time back to A is independent of the direction followed (ABCA or ACBA).

Once clocks are synchronised one can measure the one-way speed of light. However, the previous conditions that guarantee the applicability of Einstein's synchronisation do not imply that the one-way light speed turns out to be the same all over the frame. Consider

A theorem (whose origin can be traced back to von Laue and Hermann Weyl) states that Laue–Weyl's round trip condition holds if and only if the Einstein synchronisation can be applied consistently (i.e. (a) and (b1)–(b3) hold) and the one-way speed of light with respect to the so synchronised clocks is a constant all over the frame. The importance of Laue–Weyl's condition stands on the fact that the time there mentioned can be measured with only one clock; thus this condition does not rely on synchronisation conventions and can be experimentally checked. Indeed, it has been experimentally verified that the Laue–Weyl round-trip condition holds throughout an inertial frame.

Since it is meaningless to measure a one-way velocity prior to the synchronisation of distant clocks, experiments claiming a measure of the one-way speed of light can often be reinterpreted as verifying the Laue–Weyl's round-trip condition.

The Einstein synchronisation looks this natural only in inertial frames. One can easily forget that it is only a convention. In rotating frames, even in special relativity, the non-transitivity of Einstein synchronisation diminishes its usefulness. If clock 1 and clock 2 are not synchronised directly, but by using a chain of intermediate clocks, the synchronisation depends on the path chosen. Synchronisation around the circumference of a rotating disk gives a non vanishing time difference that depends on the direction used. This is important in the Sagnac effect and the Ehrenfest paradox. The Global Positioning System accounts for this effect.

A substantive discussion of Einstein synchronisation's conventionalism is due to Hans Reichenbach. Most attempts to negate the conventionality of this synchronisation are considered refuted, with the notable exception of David Malament's argument, that it can be derived from demanding a  symmetrical relation of causal connectability. Whether this settles the issue is disputed.

History: Poincaré

Some features of the conventionality of synchronization were discussed by Henri Poincaré. In 1898 (in a philosophical paper) he argued that the assumption of light's uniform speed in all directions is useful to formulate physical laws in a simple way. He also showed that the definition of simultaneity of events at different places is only a convention. Based on those conventions, but within the framework of the now superseded aether theory, Poincaré in 1900 proposed the following convention for defining clock synchronisation: 2 observers A and B, which are moving in the aether, synchronise their clocks by means of optical signals. Because of the relativity principle they believe themselves to be at rest in the aether and assume that the speed of light is constant in all directions. Therefore, they have to consider only the transmission time of the signals and then crossing their observations to examine whether their clocks are synchronous.

In 1904 Poincaré illustrated the same procedure in the following way:

See also
Relativity of simultaneity
One-way speed of light

References

Literature 

 D. Dieks, Becoming, relativity and locality, in The Ontology of Spacetime, online
 D. Dieks (ed.), The Ontology of Spacetime, Elsevier 2006, 
 D. Malament,  1977. "Causal Theories of Time and the Conventionality of Simultaniety," Noûs 11, 293–300.
 Galison, P. (2003), Einstein's Clocks, Poincaré's Maps: Empires of Time, New York: W.W. Norton, 
 A. Grünbaum. David Malament and the Conventionality of Simultaneity: A Reply, online
 S. Sarkar, J. Stachel, Did Malament Prove the Non-Conventionality of Simultaneity in the Special Theory of Relativity?, Philosophy of Science, Vol. 66, No. 2
 H. Reichenbach, Axiomatization of the theory of relativity, Berkeley University Press, 1969
 H. Reichenbach, The philosophy of space & time, Dover, New York, 1958
 H. P. Robertson, Postulate versus Observation in the Special Theory of Relativity, Reviews of Modern Physics, 1949
 R. Rynasiewicz, Definition, Convention, and Simultaneity: Malament's Result and Its Alleged Refutation by Sarkar and Stachel, Philosophy of Science, Vol. 68, No. 3, Supplement, online
 Hanoch Ben-Yami, Causality and Temporal Order in Special Relativity, British Jnl. for the Philosophy of Sci., Volume 57, Number 3, pp. 459–479, abstract online

External links
Stanford Encyclopedia of Philosophy, Conventionality of Simultaneity  (contains extensive bibliography)
Neil Ashby, Relativity in the Global Positioning System, Living Rev. Relativ. 6,  (2003), 
 How to Calibrate a Perfect Clock from John de Pillis: An interactive Flash animation showing how a clock with uniform ticking rate can precisely define a one-second time interval.
 Synchronizing Five Clocks from John de Pillis. An interactive Flash animation showing how five clocks are synchronised within a single inertial frame.

Theory of relativity
Albert Einstein